is a shipping company based in Minato-ku, Nagoya, Japan.

Operations
Isewan Terminal Service is a major shipping company serving the Chūkyō Metropolitan Area, especially Nagoya Port and Central Japan International Airport, with foreign offices in The United States, China, Taiwan, Thailand, Indonesia, Mexico, Germany, Belgium and Russia. Their main operations are harbor transportation, but are also involved in the transportation-related fields of packing, recycling, and warehousing for large-scale cargo shipments by companies. Isewan means Ise Bay which is the bay in which the company bases its business.

References

1949 establishments in Japan
Companies based in Nagoya
Shipping companies of Japan
Transport companies established in 1949